Milk River is a tributary of the Missouri River,  long, in the U.S. state of Montana and the Canadian province of Alberta.

Geography 
Much of the water in the North Fork is diverted from the St. Mary River through a canal and inverted siphon.

The main stream flows east-northeast into southern Alberta, where it is joined by the North Fork of the Milk River, from there It flows past the town of Milk River and Writing-on-Stone Provincial Park, then turns southeast into Montana, running east along the north side of the Sweetgrass Hills, turning south, passing through the Fresno Dam, then east past Havre and along the north side of the Fort Belknap Indian Reservation.

The watershed of the river extends into the Canadian provinces of Alberta and Saskatchewan and the US state of Montana. Of this  lies in Alberta,  in Saskatchewan and the remaining in Montana. The area in Alberta and Saskatchewan is one of the only parts of the Mississippi River watershed that extends into Canada.

History 

The Milk River was given its name by Captain Meriwether Lewis, of the Lewis and Clark Expedition, who described the river in his journal:

This appearance results from clays and silts suspended in its waters.  These fine-grained sediments result from the erosion of soft clay-rich rocks along the Milk River basin in southern Alberta, such as the Foremost, Oldman and Dinosaur Park formations.

At the time of Lewis's exploration, the Milk River drainage was legally part of the United States as a component of the Louisiana Purchase.  However, in 1818 U.S. negotiators swapped a portion of the Milk River watershed that lay north of 49° north latitude, receiving in exchange for a parcel of Red River of the North drainage that had previously been part of British North America. 

In 1908, the waters of the Milk River were the subject of a United States Supreme Court case clarifying the water rights of American Indian reservations. The case is known as Winters v. United States.

Habitat
The Milk River area consists of  three drainage basins – the Lost River Valley to the northeast, the Milk River in the middle, and the Kennedy Coulee to the southeast. The landscape consists of native grasslands, riparian cottonwood groves, badlands, coulees, cliffs, sand dunes, and rocky outcrops. Birds in the area include the mountain plover, burrowing owl, sage grouse, loggerhead shrike, Sprague's pipit, long-billed curlew, ferruginous hawk, prairie falcon, willet, marbled godwit, lark bunting, Baird's sparrow, McCown's longspur, and the chestnut-collared longspur. The area also supports pronghorns, western hognose snakes, bull snakes, prairie rattlesnakes, and northern leopard frogs.

See also 

Montana Stream Access Law
List of longest rivers of Canada
List of longest rivers of the United States (by main stem)
List of rivers of Montana
List of rivers of Alberta
List of tributaries of the Missouri River

References

External links 

Lewis & Clark - Glasgow and the Milk River
The Milk River Project in north-central Montana

Lewis and Clark Expedition
Rivers of Alberta
Rivers of Montana
Tributaries of the Missouri River
International rivers of North America
Rivers of Glacier County, Montana
Important Bird Areas of Alberta